Sofia Toufa (born August 13, 1983), known by her stage name SOFI (acronym for Some Other Female Interest), is a German/Greek singer and rapper. In addition to her solo career, SOFI has provided vocals on tracks by electronic music artists including deadmau5, Moguai and Savoy.

Background 

Toufa started her musical career at 13 through her group Danacee, signed to Def Jam Germany. The band has supported acts such as Destiny’s Child and Usher. Later, Toufa co-choreographed the video for Avril Lavigne’s hit-single "Girlfriend" and she was hired to co-choreograph, sing and dance on her 2008's Best Damn World Tour. In 2009, she toured the world as back up singer for Britney Spears on her Circus 2009 World Tour. Toufa has also worked with Fall Out Boy, Will.I.Am, deadmau5, Butch Walker, Mötley Crüe, Tommy Lee and Nelly Furtado.

Discography 
Toufa has recorded both as a lead artist and as a featured artist:

As lead artist

As featured artist

References

External links
Sofia Toufa at AllMusic.com
Sofia Toufa on MySpace

1983 births
Living people
German people of Greek descent
German rock singers
German female dancers
German electronic musicians
Mau5trap artists
21st-century German  women singers